Express kidnapping is a method of abduction where a small immediate ransom is demanded, often by the victim being forced to withdraw money from their ATM account.

Known in the United States since at least 1986, they are more commonly associated with urban areas of Latin America, such as Mexico, Venezuela, Peru, Brazil and Colombia. In some parts of Latin America, express kidnappings known as a  millionaire tour (in Spanish paseo millonario) involve an innocent taxi cab passenger and a criminal driver, who stops to pick up associates. The passenger is taken to a variety of ATMs, and forced to "max out" their bank card at each.

This type of kidnapping does not require much experience or preparation and is suspected of being committed by inexperienced criminals more often than not.

References

External links
Colombia's fight to end violence, BBC News, June 3, 2006
Entry 4, Silvana Paternostro, June 19, 2003

Crime in Latin America
Kidnapping
Robbery